Robert Hutchinson (born November 12, 1957) is an American writer and essayist known for his popular books on Christianity, Biblical Studies and the Vatican.<ref>[https://www.nytimes.com/books/98/08/02/bib/980802.rv131627.html Review of When in Rome],New York Times </ref> Hutchinson has published articles in Christianity Today and U.S. Catholic. His book, When in Rome, is one of the books on Italy recommended by the Lonely Planet travel guide.

Appearances
An avid traveler, Hutchinson has lectured on writing at seminars and conferences in Europe and the United States. He has also appeared on a number of TV shows, including "Fox News" "Spirited Debate" with Lauren Green and the Christian Broadcasting Network. In addition, Hutchinson has been a guest on nationally syndicated radio talk shows and podcasts, including Handel in the Morning, Point of View with Kirby Anderson and The Bottom Line with Roger Marsh.

 Bibliography 

References

External links
 Robert Hutchinson's website
 Robert J. Hutchinson, author profile at Random House
 review of When in Rome: A Journal of Life in Vatican City, Michael Farrell, National Catholic Reporter, August 14, 1998
 The Politically Incorrect Guide To The Bible, guest appearance on the Smith & Riley Show''
Author Biography at Goodreads

1957 births
Living people
20th-century American writers
21st-century American writers
American religious writers